Taste was a cookery television programme which first aired in the United Kingdom on Sky One in 2005.  The show had sixty-five (65) 1 hour-long episodes (45 minutes without adverts) since October 2005, and was presented by Beverley Turner, together with accompanying guest chefs.  It was subsequently repeated on Sky Two.

In the early hours of weekday mornings it was repeated on Sky Three, all recipes on the show could be found on the show's website.

Chefs appearing on the show included Jean-Christophe Novelli, Marcus Wareing, Richard Phillips, Ed Baines, Paul Bloxham, Gino D'Acampo, Merrilees Parker, and Ching-He Huang.

References

External links

Sky UK original programming
2005 British television series debuts
2000s British cooking television series
2006 British television series endings
British cooking television shows